Pétur Sigurðsson (16 July 1928 – 19 September 2002) was an Icelandic sprinter. He competed in the men's 100 metres at the 1952 Summer Olympics.

References

1928 births
2002 deaths
Athletes (track and field) at the 1952 Summer Olympics
Petur Sigurdsson
Petur Sigurdsson
Place of birth missing